In the 1987 Mediterranean Games, one of the games played was volleyball. Spain won the men's division and Albania won the women's.

Medalists

Standings

Men's competition

Women's competition

External links
 Complete 1987 Mediterranean Games Standings

Sports at the 1987 Mediterranean Games
Volleyball at the Mediterranean Games
1987 in volleyball